Samuel Lynes (1822 – July 29, 1878) was Warden of the Borough of Norwalk, Connecticut from 1853 to 1855, from 1859 to 1860, and from 1871 to 1872.

He was born in Ridgebury, Connecticut in 1822, the son of Stephen C. and Hannah Lynes.

He graduated from Yale College in 1842, then went on to study at the College of Physicians and Surgeons in New York. He moved to Norwalk in 1845 where he practiced medicine until his death.

Associations 
 President, Fairfield County Savings Bank
 Treasurer, Norwalk Fire Insurance Company
 Director, National Bank of Norwalk
 Trustee, St. John's Masonic Lodge Number 6
 Member, Washington Chapter Number 24, Royal Arch Masons
 Member, Odd Fellows
 Vestryman, St. Paul's Episcopal Church
 Trustee, Connecticut Hospital for the Insane at Middletown
 Member, Water Commission
 Member, Auditor; Norwalk Club
 Member, Norwalk Yacht Club

References 

1822 births
1878 deaths
American Freemasons
Physicians from Connecticut
Columbia University Vagelos College of Physicians and Surgeons alumni
Mayors of Norwalk, Connecticut
People from Ridgefield, Connecticut
Yale College alumni
19th-century American politicians
19th-century American Episcopalians